Janet Celesta Lowe (May 15, 1940 – December 31, 2019) was an American author, university lecturer and business writer.

Biography
Lowe was born May 15, 1940 in Santa Rosa, California to Celesta and Deke Lowe. She worked as production assistant or producer for several television stations, usually in their news departments. She then positioned herself as a marketing resource for television stations, preparing regular newsletters, providing web pages and web content, and holding workshops for station workers.

University experience
Lowe has taught in the University of California (San Diego) as an Investments and Journalism Professor.

Published works
Lowe has been business editor of the San Diego Tribune and editor of the San Diego Daily Transcript.  She has been published in Newsweek, Los Angeles Times, Dallas Morning News, San Jose Mercury News, Modern Maturity and other national magazines. She specializes in writing books about business leaders.

Speaks books
 1998: Bill Gates Speaks: Insights from the World's Greatest Entrepreneur
 1999: Ted Turner Speaks: Insights from the World's Greatest Maverick
 2001: Oprah Winfrey Speaks: Insights from the World's Most Influential Voice
 2007: Warren Buffett Speaks: Wit and Wisdom from the World's Greatest Investor
 2009: Google Speaks: Secrets of the World's Greatest Billionaire Entrepreneurs, Sergey Brin and Larry Page

Other books
 1988: Dividends Don't Lie: Finding Value in Blue-Chip Stocks co-authored with Geraldine Weiss
1996: Value investing Made Easy
 2000: Damn Right! Behind the Scenes with Berkshire Hathaway Billionaire Charlie Munger

References

1940 births
2019 deaths
American business writers
Women business writers
American finance and investment writers
University of North Texas faculty
University of Texas at Dallas faculty
Writers from Santa Fe, New Mexico
People from Santa Rosa, California